André Göransson and Florian Lakat were the defending champions but lost in the quarterfinals to Gerard Granollers and Pedro Martínez.

Hans Hach Verdugo and Luke Saville won the title after defeating Granollers and Martínez 6–3, 6–2 in the final.

Seeds

Draw

References
 Main Draw
 Qualifying Draw

Tiburon Challenger - Doubles
2018 Doubles